East End is a town and one of the five districts of the Cayman Islands. Located on south-east coast of Grand Cayman, in 2021 it had a population of 1,846.

References

Populated places in the Cayman Islands
Grand Cayman